The Finnish national bandy team has taken part in all the Bandy World Championships for men since the competition was launched for the first time in 1957. Finland won the championship title in 2004. They have always finished in the top four, and have won 28 medals in 36 championships.

The team is controlled by Finland's Bandy Association.

History

Finland was represented by the club Polyteknikkojen Urheiluseura (PUS) in the winter games in Helsinki in 1907, but the team was beaten by a team from Sweden.

The first international bandy game after Finland became independent was held during the 1919 Finnish Winter Games in Helsinki, which were the first international sporting event organized by the recently independent nation. The national team's roster was dominated by players from Viipurin Sudet and included only three players representing other domestic clubs, Harald Nyström from HIFK, Lars Schybergson from Kiffen, and Niilo Tammisalo from HJK. The national team's match against the Swedish club IFK Uppsala was held on 23 February at Töölön Pallokenttä before a crowd of 5,000 spectators, including State Regent of Finland C.G.E. Mannerheim. The Finns won the match 4–1 in a victory that was described in the press as “one of the most amazing achievements of Finnish athletes.” 

In the 1920s and 1930s, Finland regularly played friendly games against Sweden and against Estonia.

Finland, Norway, and Sweden played bandy at the 1952 Winter Olympics in Oslo. After having seen them there, the Soviet Union invited these three countries to a four nation bandy tournament in 1954. This was the first time a Soviet national bandy team met other national bandy teams. The four countries used somewhat different rules prior to this tournament, but the rules were adjusted to be the same for the future.

The first ever World Championships of bandy were organised in 1957 in association with the 50th anniversary of the Ball Association of Finland, which at the time was the governing body of bandy in Finland. It was played at the Helsinki Olympic Stadium. 

Finland's Bandy Association was founded in 1972.

World Championship record

Russian Government Cup

Current squad 
Finnish squad at the 2014 World Championship in Irkutsk, Russia, January 26 – February 2, 2014.

References

External links
 Finnish Bandy Federation

National bandy teams
Bandy in Finland
Bandy
Bandy World Championship-winning countries